American Deutsch Bag is an EP by Teenage Bottlerocket. It was released on November 26, 2013 on Fat Wreck Chords. It was recorded at The Blasting Room with Andrew Berlin. The EP features one original song and two covers. One of the covers is a pop punk version of the German song "Ich bin Auslander und Spreche Nicht Gut Deutsch". The other, "Via Munich" is originally by Tony Sly and was recorded for The Songs of Tony Sly: A Tribute.

Track listing

Personnel
 Kody Templeman – guitar, vocals
 Ray Carlisle – guitar, vocals
 Miguel Chen – bass
 Brandon Carlisle – drums
 Andrew Berlin – engineer, mixer

References

2013 EPs
Fat Wreck Chords albums
Teenage Bottlerocket albums